The women's long jump at the 2018 IAAF World U20 Championships was held at Ratina Stadium on 12 and 13 July.

Records

Results

Qualification
The qualification round took place on 12 July, in two groups, both starting at 10:18. Athletes attaining a mark of at least 6.25 metres ( Q ) or at least the 12 best performers ( q ) qualified for the final.

Final
The final was held on 13 July at 19:49.

References

long jump
Long jump at the World Athletics U20 Championships